Herberhausen is a village (borough:Ortsteil) belonging to Göttingen, Lower Saxony, in Germany.

Geography
The village centre's elevation is 240 metres above sea level.

The total area allotted to the borough (mostly forest) is 1524 ha.

Etymology 
In the fourteenth century, the community was called  Herborgehusen and Herbergehusen.  Toward the end of that century, the shortened form "Herberhusen" became the standard form.

History
The earliest written document mentioning the town is from the year 1293. On 1 April 1963 the village was incorporated into the city of Göttingen as a borough.

Population 
(2006): 1,698

Göttingen